This article lists political parties in Azerbaijan. Azerbaijan is a one party dominant state. Opposition parties against the New Azerbaijan Party are functioning, but are widely considered to have no real chance of gaining power.

As of 2022, 59 political parties are officially registered in Azerbaijan. 10 of them are represented in the National Assembly of Azerbaijan.

Parties represented in the National Assembly

Other parties

Alliance Party for the Sake of Azerbaijan (Azərbaycan Naminə Alyans Partiyası)
Azerbaijan Communist Party (Azərbaycan Kommunist Partiyası)
Azerbaijan Democrat Party (Azərbaycan Demokrat Partiyası
Azerbaijan Democratic Enlightenment Party (Azərbaycan Demokratik Maarifçilik Partiyası
Azerbaijan Liberal Party (Azərbaycan Liberal Partiyası)
Azerbaijan Liberal Democrat Party (Azərbaycan Liberal Demokrat Partiyası)
Azerbaijan National Democrat Party (Azərbaycan Milli Demokrat Partiyası)
Azerbaijan National Independence Party (Azərbaycan Milli İstiqlal Partiyası)  
Azerbaijan National Statehood Party (Azərbaycan Milli Dövlətçilik Partiyası
Azerbaijan Republicans Party (Azərbaycan Respublikaçılar Partiyası
Azerbaijani Social Democratic Party (Azerbaycan Sosial Demokrat Partiyası)
Azerbaijan Social Prosperity Party (Azərbaycan Sosial Rifah Partiyası)
Azerbaijan United Communist Party  (Azərbaycan Vahid Kommunist Partiyası)
Civic Unity Party (Azerbaijan) (Vətəndaş Birliyi Partiyası)
Citizen and Development Party (Vətəndaş və İnkişaf Partiyası)
Classical Popular Front Party (Klassik Xalq Cəbhəsi Partiyasi)
Future Azerbaijan Party (Gələcək Azərbaycan Partiyası)
Justice Party (Ədalət Partiyası)
Gorgud Party (Qorqud Partiyası
Great Azerbaijan Party (Böyük Azərbaycan Partiyası)
Great Order Party (Böyük Quruluş Partiyası) 
Independent Azerbaijan Party (Müstəqil Azərbaycan Partiyası)
Independent Democrats Party (Azad Demokratlar Partiyası)
Independent People's Party (Müstəqil Xalq Partiyası)
Intelligents Party (Aydınlar Partiyası)
Modern Musavat Party (Müasir Müsavat Partiyası)
National Democratic Party of Cognition (Milli Demokrat İdrak Partiyası)
National Revival Movement Party (Milli Dirçəliş Hərəkatı Partiyası)
National Solidarity Party (Milli Həmrəylik Partiyası)
National Unity Party (Milli Vəhdət Partiyası)
New Time Party (Yeni Zaman Partiyası)
Republican People's Party (Cümhuriyyət Xalq Partiyası)
United Azerbaijan National Unity Party (Vahid Azərbaycan Milli Birlik Partiyası)
White Party (Ağ Partiyası)
Whole Azerbaijan Popular Front Party (Bütöv Azərbaycan Xalq Cəbhəsi Partiyası)

See also
 Lists of political parties

References
"List of Azerbaijani political parties (2022)" Central Election Commission of Azerbaijan (in Azerbaijani)

 
Azerbaijan
Political parties in Azerbaijan
Political parties
Azerbaijan
Azerbaijan